Stephen Hoare (born 30 October 1975) is a retired Australian professional basketball player.

Career highlights
Awarded "Players Player" at the Gold Coast Blaze 2012.
Awarded "Players Player" at the Gold Coast Blaze 2011.
Awarded "Players Player" at the Townsville Crocodiles 2010.
Won the NBL Championship with the Melbourne Tigers 2008.
Named 2007 NBL Best Sixth Man.
Won the NBL Championship with the Melbourne Tigers 2006.
Named 2006 NBL Best Sixth Man.
Played in 4 straight NBL Grand Finals (2006–2009).
Selected in the 2004/05 NBL All-Star team.
Second overall in the 2003 NBL Best Sixth Man award
Third overall in the 2002 NBL Best Sixth Man award
Selected to the ABA Conference First Team in 2001 and 2002.
ABA All-Star in 1997
Part of Australian Under 23 squad in 1996

Statistics
Currently ranked 21st All Time in Games Played in the NBL (he played 465 games in the league).
Currently ranked 6th All Time in Games Played for the Melbourne Tigers (he played 312 games for the club).
Only twice in his 17-year career did a team with Hoare on it miss the finals.
He is ranked in the Top 10 All Time Individual Stats for the Melbourne Tigers in the following categories:
 **Games Played (312) ranked #6
 **Points Scored (2,948) ranked #6
 **Field Attempts (2,257) ranked #7
 **Field Goals Made (1,170) ranked #5
 **Field Goal % (52% 1170/2257) ranked #9
 **3PT Attempts (494) ranked #9
 **3PT Made (179) ranked #8
 **3PT % (36% 179/494) ranked #7
 **Free Throw Attempts (633) ranked #6
 **Free Throws Made (429) ranked #6
 **Assists (805) ranked #7
 **Total Rebounds (1,900) ranked #4
 **Offensive Rebounds (663) ranked #4
 **Defensive Rebounds (1,237) ranked #5

External links
 Stephen Hoare at worldhoopstats.com

1975 births
Living people
Australian men's basketball players
Gold Coast Blaze players
Melbourne Tigers players
North Melbourne Giants players
Basketball players from Melbourne
Townsville Crocodiles players
West Sydney Razorbacks players
Power forwards (basketball)
20th-century Australian people
21st-century Australian people